A disc coupling, by definition, transmits torque from a driving to a driven bolt or shaft tangentially on a common bolt circle. Torque is transmitted between the bolts through a series of thin, stainless steel discs assembled in a pack. Misalignment is accomplished by deforming of the material between the bolts.

A disc coupling is a high performance motion control (servo) coupling designed to be the torque transmitting element (by connecting two shafts together) while accommodating for shaft misalignment. It is designed to be flexible, while remaining torsionally strong under high torque loads. Typically, disc couplings can handle speeds up to 10,000 r/min.

Types 
There are two different styles of disc coupling:
 Single disc style couplings are composed of two hubs (the ends of the coupling, which are typically made from aluminum, but stainless steel is used as well) and a single, flat, stainless steel disc spring.
 Double disc style couplings are also composed of two hubs, but has an additional center spacer sandwiching two disc springs. The center spacer can be made out of the same material as the hubs, but is sometimes available in insulating acetal, which makes the coupling electrically isolating.

The difference between the two styles is that single disc couplings cannot accommodate parallel misalignment due to the complex bending that would be required of the lone disc. Double disc styles allow the two discs to bend in opposite directions to better manage parallel offset. The discs are fastened to the hubs (and center spacer on double disc styles) with tight fitting pins that do not allow any play or backlash between the disc and the hubs. The discs can be bent easily and as a result, disc couplings have some of the lowest bearing loads available in a motion control coupling.

Use 
Torsionally stiff and still flexible, disc couplings are a great solution for high speed applications. The downside is that they are more delicate than the average coupling and can be damaged if misused. Special care should be taken to ensure that misalignment is within the ratings of the coupling.

See also
 Compliant mechanism
 Oldham coupler
 Rag joint 
 Thompson coupling 
 Universal joint

References

Rotating shaft couplings